This list of tallest buildings in Europe ranks skyscrapers in Europe by height exceeding 190 meters. For decades, only a few major cities, such as Moscow, London, Paris, and Frankfurt contained skyscrapers. In recent years, however, construction has spread to many other cities on the continent, including Warsaw, Milan, Lyon, Manchester, Madrid, Rotterdam, and Istanbul. The tallest building in Europe is the Lakhta Center, located in Saint Petersburg, the Russian Federation.

Tallest buildings
Architectural details do not include antenna masts. Existing structures are included for ranking purposes based on present height. Many non-architectural extensions (such as radio antennas) are easily added and removed from tall buildings without significantly changing the style and design of the building, which is seen as a significant part of the value of these buildings.

Timeline of tallest buildings

Under construction

Cancelled
This list ranks notable buildings that have been cancelled in Europe that were meant to rise to at least .

Diagrams

See also
 List of tallest structures in Europe
 List of tallest buildings in Europe by year
 List of tallest buildings in the European Union
 List of tallest buildings in the Balkans
 List of tallest buildings in Africa
 List of tallest buildings in Asia
 List of tallest buildings in Oceania
 List of tallest buildings in the world

Notes
  Only skyscrapers located in the European part of Istanbul are included. See Europe for more details.
  Specifically located in the La Défense district, town of Courbevoie, in the inner suburbs of Paris
  Specifically located in Nanterre, in the inner suburbs of Paris
  Specifically located in La Défense district, town of Puteaux, in the inner suburbs of Paris
  Specifically located in Saint-Denis, in the inner suburbs of Paris
  Specifically located in La Défense, in the inner suburbs of Paris

References

External links 

 Famous Buildings in Europe